Carlos Morales may refer to:

Sports
Carlos Morales (footballer, born 1979), Mexican association football player
Carlos Luis Morales (born 1965), Ecuadorian association football goalkeeper
Carlos María Morales (born 1970), Uruguayan footballer
Carlos Morales (soccer, born 1982) (born 1982), Puerto Rican association football player
Carlos Morales (footballer, born 1968), Paraguayan association football player
Carlos Morales (athlete), Chilean track and field sprinter in the 1991 South American Championships in Athletics

Politics
Carlos Felipe Morales (1868–1914), Dominican priest, politician, and military figure
Carlos Mireles Morales (born 1937), Mexican politician
Carlos Morales Troncoso (1940–2014), Dominican vice-president and foreign minister
Carlos Raúl Morales (born 1970), Guatemalan diplomat

Other
Carlos Emilio Morales (1939–2014), Cuban jazz guitarist
Carlos Morales Quintana (born 1970), Spanish architect
Carlos Morales (actor), Filipino actor